Scott Lipsky and Divij Sharan were the defending champions, but Lipsky chose not to participate. Sharan played alongside Artem Sitak, but lost in the semifinals to Nicolas Mahut and Édouard Roger-Vasselin.

Mahut and Roger-Vasselin went on to win the title, defeating Marcelo Demoliner and Santiago González in the final, 6–4, 7–5.

Seeds

Draw

Draw

References

External links
 Main draw

European Open - Doubles
2018 Doubles